Events in the year 1884 in Iceland.

Incumbents 

 Monarch: Christian IX
 Minister for Iceland: Johannes Nellemann

Events 

 The National Gallery of Iceland is founded in Copenhagen, Denmark.

References 

 
1880s in Iceland
Years of the 19th century in Iceland
Iceland
Iceland